Beata Stoczyńska (born 21 August 1961 in Sieradz as Beata Sutuła) is a Polish diplomat, since February 2018 serving as an ambassador to Indonesia.

Life 
Beata Stoczyńska was born on 21 August 1961 in Sieradz. She has graduated from the Wrocław University of Economics. She was also educated at Stanford University, Australian National University and in New Delhi.

In 1993 she began her career at the Ministry of Foreign Affairs. She worked as the deputy head of mission at the embassy in Canberra between 1996 and 2000. Afterwards, she was the deputy director of the Asia and Pacific Department. Between 24 November 2009 and 30 June 2014 she served as an ambassador to New Zealand. Later, she worked at the MFA on director post.

In February 2018 she was appointed ambassador to Indonesia, additionally accredited to East Timor and ASEAN. On 4 April 2018, she presented her credentials to the President of Indonesia Joko Widodo.

Besides Polish, Stoczyńska speaks English, French, and Russian.

References 

1961 births
Ambassadors of Poland to Indonesia
Ambassadors of Poland to New Zealand
Living people
People from Sieradz
Wrocław University of Economics alumni
Polish women ambassadors